is a transportation company based in Hiroshima, Japan.

Hiroshima Rapid Transit operate a rapid transit line called the Astram Line in Hiroshima.

External links
  

 
Companies based in Hiroshima
Railway companies of Japan
Astram Line